Massimo Giletti (born 18 March 1962, in Turin) is an Italian television host and journalist.

Biography
He was born in a wealthy family from Piedmont. His father Emilio Giletti  was a racing driver and a industrialist, owner of a textile factory in the Province of Biella.

He started working as journalist with Giovanni Minoli working in the staff of Rai 2 program Mixer, for six years.

In 1994 started working as television host in the daily Rai 2 programs Mattina in famiglia and Mezzogiorno in famiglia, with Paola Perego. In 1996 left those programs and started presenting another show, I fatti vostri, working there until 2002.

Between the 1990s and 2000s he hosted also other shows like Il Lotto alle Otto, the charity TV marathon Telethon and the primetime show La grande occasione. From September 2002 switched to Rai 1 presenting the afternoon show Casa Raiuno, aired for two seasons. In summer 2003 has presented the primetime show Beato tra le donne.

In 2004/2005 hosted the Sunday afternoon show Domenica in with Mara Venier and Paolo Limiti, and the year after began presenting just a segment of Domenica in, named Domenica in - L'Arena.

In the 2000s has also presented the event shows Miss Italia nel Mondo, Sanremo dalla A alla Z, Una voce per Padre Pio, Mare latino and Buon Natale con Frate Indovino. In 2009 and 2010 was in the cast of the primetime show Ciak si... canta!.

Recently, Giletti made a factually incorrect observation during a popular Rai 1 TV programme (the above-mentioned Domenica in - L'arena) when he stated that the Maltese armed forces shoot African boat people approaching Malta. He later retracted his statement.

Television 
Mattina in famiglia (Rai 2, 1994 – 1996)
Mezzogiorno in famiglia (Rai 2, 1994 – 1996)
I fatti vostri (Rai 2, 1996 – 2002)
Il Lotto alle Otto (Rai 2, 2000)
La grande occasione (Rai 2, 2000)
Casa Raiuno (Rai 1, 2002 – 2004)
Beato tra le donne (Rai 1, 2003)
Domenica in - L'Arena (Rai 1, 2004 – 2013)
Miss Italia nel Mondo (Rai 1, 2007, 2010)
Sanremo dalla A alla Z (Rai 1, 2007 – 2008)
Una voce per Padre Pio (Rai 1, 2007 – 2010)
Mare latino (Rai 1, 2009 – 2010)
Buon Natale con Frate Indovino (Rai 1, 2010)
L'Arena (Rai 1, 2013 - 2017)
Non è l'Arena (La7, since 2017)

References

External links

Living people
1962 births
Italian television presenters
Italian television journalists
Mass media people from Turin